Juncus heterophyllus  is an aquatic species of rush. It is native to the Mediterranean.

External links
Jepson Manual Treatment
Photo gallery

heterophyllus
Plants described in 1825
Flora of the Western United States
Flora without expected TNC conservation status